DWLS (97.1 FM), broadcasting as Barangay LS 97.1, is a radio station owned and operated by GMA Network. It serves as the flagship station of Barangay FM. The station's studio is located at the GMA Network Annex Building, EDSA cor. GMA Network Dr., Diliman, Quezon City, and its transmitter is located at GMA Tower of Power, Brgy. Culiat, Tandang Sora, Quezon City.

Barangay LS was recognized as the #1 FM radio station in Metro Manila, according to the Nielsen Radio Audience Measurement survey conducted in the month of May 2017.

History

1955–1986: DZXX/DWXX
It first aired in June 1955, when "Uncle Bob" Stewart opened DZXX-AM 890 kHz station under the control of the Republic Broadcasting System (RBS). DZXX made history as the first pop music station in the country using the AM format, playing both local and international pop music of that era. In 1972, DZXX temporarily shut down due to Martial Law, later it was revived under the label DZXX/DWXX 1000 (Double X) when Hypersonic Broadcasting Corporation owned this station. In 1978, its frequency changed to 1026 kHz (based on GE75). In 1986, NBC acquired and renamed its station to DZAM-AM.

1976–1992: WLS FM/The Giant
In July 1976, GMA launched its third radio station 97.1 WLS FM as an adult standards and jazz station. In 1981, at the height of popularity of pop music, it switched to Adult Top 40 format, with the slogan The Best Music. It was known for playing hourly Beatles music every weekday early mornings, which was later on adopted by 100.3 RJFM. In November 1988, upon the completion of GMA's Tower of Power, WLS earned the brand, The Giant 97.1 WLS FM.

1992–2007: Campus Radio
When GMA was renamed as the "Rainbow Satellite Network" in early 1992, the station was reformatted on April 30, 1992, as Campus Radio 97.1 WLS FM, with a Top 40 format. This was to target teens & early adults. Its notable programs were the longest-running program on the station, the legendary "Top 20 at 12" (anchored by Milo Cavarlez, a.k.a. "The Triggerman," which was first heard on Kiss FM 101.1 (now 101.1 Yes The Best), where the top 20 songs of the day were counted down in the mold of BBC Radio 1's The Official Chart Show at noontime, and "Campus Aircheck", an institution of sorts for aspiring DJs to get hired by Campus Radio, touted as "the first school on the air".

In 1995, when Miguel "Mike" Enriquez took over GMA's radio operations, Campus Radio was reformatted to a contemporary MOR format, earning its slogan "Forever!". At this time, a few programs were introduced, notably the Message Center, wherein one's message must not be a greeting. By the amp of 1999, it shifted back to Top 40. During their heyday as an English-language radio station, they used jingles designed for the station by JAM Creative Productions.

2007–present: Barangay LS
On February 14, 2007, Campus Radio rebranded as Barangay LS 97.1, using its old slogan, "Forever!". It reverts to a masa format. Despite Campus Radio's dominant ratings performance in the pop category, GMA's FM radio sales unit failed to sell the format. With consistently low sales figures, this paved the way for Mike Enriquez to successfully persuade the network's upper management to agree to shift WLS to a seemingly more profitable "masa" format. Most of the staff were retained, albeit changing their names. Unfortunately, the industry reception is lukewarm and Barangay LS has yet to regain the revenue losses incurred by the shift of advertisers to competing FM stations.

Last January 16, 2008, at around 6 pm, the station launched its new tagline, "Ayos!", which is also the tagline for RGMA's provincial Campus Radio stations. That same day, almost all of the staff who were also from the former Campus Radio format, and after years of loyal service to GMA Network, were summarily dismissed by Mike Enriquez. Despite rising from #7 to #4 in the ratings, Enriquez deemed them unfit to take the format to the ratings game. In turn, they were replaced unceremoniously by jocks from RGMA provincial radio stations as well as jocks from other masa stations.

On January 17, 2011, facing competition with the latest masa stations, the new tagline "Tugstugan Na!" was launched and the station adopted the "crazy fun" sound brand in the market. Mike Enriquez was replaced by Glenn F. Allona as program director/station manager, aiming Barangay LS to bring back the focus on the staple of FM Programming which is music.

On February 17, 2014, Barangay LS 97.1 was rebranded with reformatted programs, new jingle, a new logo & a new slogan called "Isang Bansa, Isang Barangay". Along its reformat, RGMA's FM radio stations carrying the Campus Radio brand (including 99.5 RT in Cebu, 103.5 Wow FM in Davao and Super Radyo DYRU 92.9 in Kalibo) adopted the Barangay FM branding. The network rebranding was made to compete with its rival FM radio network My Only Radio, owned by the network's competitor ABS-CBN, following the relaunch of DWRR-FM as MOR's flagship station seven months earlier.

In July 2019, the station readapted its original slogan "Forever!" (after it was dropped in 2008). Ken Chan and Rita Daniela performed its station's new jingle entitled Tayo ay Forever under GMA Music.

On March 20, 2020, the station implements a scaled-down programming operation due to the present situation and conditions affecting the radio station's staff due to the enhanced quarantine against COVID-19. On the same day, the station began its hookup with its sister AM-station Super Radyo DZBB 594.

See also
GMA Network
GTV
GMA Super Radyo DZBB 594

References

External links

Barangay FM stations
Barangay LS 97.1
Radio stations in Metro Manila
Radio stations established in 1955
1955 establishments in the Philippines